The Powerstation is a music venue in Eden Terrace, Auckland, it is one of the few remaining small music venues in New Zealand.

History 

First opened in the 1950s as a hotel lobby, The Powerstation soon become a "dine-and-dance" venue. In 1989, Galaxy started to host five bands for five dollars glam metal shows - sparking a renewed interest in the genre in Auckland.

In 1986 Simon Grigg, Roger Perry, and Tom Sampson opened the house music club 'Asylum' within the Galaxy venue. Whilst initially starting as a club playing hip hop, soul, and pop music, it soon gained a reputation for playing house music, making it the first house music club in Australasia. Grigg described Asylum as one of the first clubs that had no colour or race barriers, so the crowd came from south, west, north, east and central Auckland and mostly happily mixed'.

By 2008, Galaxy had turned into an 80s-themed bar called Bar Retro. In 2009, Bar Retro went into receivership and Peter Campbell bought it and branded it as the Powerstation.

Notable Performances 
The Pixies performed their first show in New Zealand in 2010 at The Powerstation.

Lorde's 2017 show had to be urgently rescheduled from The Powerstation to the Bruce Mason Centre as there were liquor-licensing issues for an all-ages gig.

In 2018, The Powerstation agreed to host - and then cancelled - an event hosted by far-right speakers Lauren Southern and Stefan Molyneux, generating controversy first for agreeing to host it, and then for cancelling it.

References 

Music venues in New Zealand
Buildings and structures in Auckland
Waitematā Local Board Area